Ubon Abasi Ifiok Obot (born 16 July 1996) is a Nigerian footballer who currently plays as a forward for FK Egnatia.

Career statistics

Club

Notes

References

1996 births
Living people
Nigerian footballers
Nigerian expatriate footballers
Association football forwards
Kategoria e Parë players
KS Shkumbini Peqin players
Nigerian expatriate sportspeople in Albania
Expatriate footballers in Albania